Demel (colloquially der Demel) is a famous pastry shop and chocolaterie established in 1786 in Vienna, Austria. The company bears the title of a Purveyor to the Imperial and Royal Court (k.u.k. Hofzuckerbäcker) up to today.

Location 

The building is located in the central Innere Stadt district on Kohlmarkt 14 near Hofburg Palace. The interior was designed by Portois and Fix decorators in a Neo-baroque style. The white-aproned waitresses — the Demelinerinnen — usually address the customers in a traditional honorific third person style, "Haben schon gewählt?" or "Wollen etwas zu sich nehmen, wenn belieben?". The cabaret artist Helmut Qualtinger extolled their timeless quality in his song Die Demelinerinnen.

Demel temporarily had one additional location in Salzburg, which was closed in March 2012. The company formerly had a small cafe at The Plaza's Retail Collection in New York City, but this location has since closed (as of March 2010). The corporate website indicates they are continuing to look for a new location to operate in New York.

History
The k.k. Hofzuckerbäckerei pastry shop was founded on Michaelerplatz by Ludwig Dehne, a confectioner from Württemberg. Upon his early death in 1799, the business was continued by his widow for their minor son August Dehne. In 1813 she purchased the house on Michaelerplatz 14. August Dehne inherited the company in 1832 and successfully managed the business, however, as his son pursued an academic career, he sold the company to his journeyman Christoph Demel in 1857.

Renamed Ch. Demel's Söhne in 1867, Christoph Demel's sons Joseph and Karl continued the business and were granted the title of a purveyor to the Habsburg court by Emperor Franz Joseph I of Austria in 1874. When in 1888 the old Burgtheater on Michaelerplatz was demolished combined with a general refurbishment of the whole square, they moved the confectionery around the corner to Kohlmarkt, where the company is still located today in its original building. In the heyday of the Austro-Hungarian monarchy, notable customers included Empress Elisabeth (Sisi), Princess Pauline von Metternich, and actress Katharina Schratt. During the Austrian Anschluss to Nazi Germany 1938–45, the Vienna Gauleiter Baldur von Schirach and his wife Henriette were regulars here.

The company was headed by Demel's heirs until 1972, when the entrepreneur Udo Proksch bought it and established the Club 45 on the first floor, a popular venue of the Vienna high society. After Proksch was arrested for his involvement in the Lucona affair in 1989, the Raiffeisen Bank became the owner of the famous company. In 2002 the Do & Co restaurants and catering company took over Demel.

Legal issues

In the early decades of the twentieth century, a legal battle over the use of the label "The Original Sacher Torte" developed between the Hotel Sacher and the Demel bakery.  Eduard Sacher, son of Franz Sacher, the inventor of Sachertorte, had completed his own recipe of his father's cake during his time at Demel, which was the first establishment to offer the "Original" cake. Following the death of Eduard's widow Anna in 1930 and the bankruptcy of the Hotel Sacher in 1934, Eduard Sacher's son (also named Eduard Sacher) found employment at Demel and brought to the bakery the sole distribution right for an Eduard-Sacher-Torte.

The first differences of opinion arose in 1938, when the new owners of the Hotel Sacher began to sell Sacher Tortes from vendor carts under the trademarked name "The Original Sacher Torte".  After interruptions brought about by the Second World War and the ensuing Allied occupation, the hotel owners sued Demel in 1954, with the hotel asserting its trademark rights and the bakery claiming it developed and bought the title "Original Sacher Torte".

Over the next seven years, both parties waged an intense legal war over several of the dessert's specific characteristics, including the change of the name, the second layer of jam in the middle of the cake, and the substitution of margarine for butter in the baking of the cake.  The author Friedrich Torberg, who was a frequent guest at both establishments, served as a witness during this process and testified that, during the lifetime of Anna Sacher, the cake was never covered with marmalade or cut through the middle.  In 1963 both parties agreed on an out of court settlement that gave the Hotel Sacher the rights to the phrase "The Original Sachertorte" and gave the Demel the rights to decorate its tortes with a triangular seal that reads Eduard-Sacher-Torte.

Demel Museum

The Vienna site features a museum with artifacts about the history of the Imperial chocolate-making bakery.

See also

 List of restaurants in Vienna

References

External links 

 Demel.at 
 Demel Museum

Food and drink companies based in Vienna
Food and drink companies established in 1786
Retail companies established in 1786
Chocolateries
Purveyors to the Imperial and Royal Court
Buildings and structures in Innere Stadt
Museums in Vienna
Chocolate museums
Shops in Austria